DYXX-TV is a commercial translator television station owned by Intercontinental Broadcasting Corporation. Its studio and transmitter are located at Barangay Lawa-an, Roxas City, Philippines. This channel currently inactive as of this time since it was last on air in 1993, when the typhoon struck the city caused the transmitter was heavily damaged brought by a storm.

See also
 List of Intercontinental Broadcasting Corporation channels and stations
 DYJB-TV

Intercontinental Broadcasting Corporation stations
Television stations in Roxas, Capiz
Television channels and stations established in 1977